Eric Reyes Buhain (born April 12, 1970) is a Filipino politician and former competitive swimmer serving as the Representative for Batangas's 1st district since 2022.

He won several medals in the Southeast Asian Games from 1985 to 1993, and participated in the 1988 and 1992 Summer Olympics. He later became a sports administrator. During the Arroyo administration, he served as chairman of the Philippine Sports Commission, chairman of the Games and Amusements Board, and an executive director of the Bureau of Immigration.

Career

Competitive swimming
Eric ventured into swimming not because he dreamed of winning an Olympic gold medal, but because of his doctor's advice to improve his lungs. Eric was born with primary lung complex. He enrolled in a two-week swimming program at the age of seven. Yet his training was breached by another illness, hepatitis. However, this didn't stop him; a year later he was training again and taking the advance course in swimming, the competitive course, at age nine. It was at this age that he got into the varsity swimming team of De La Salle Santiago Zobel School and vowed to win a gold medal in the sport.

By 1981, he was a member of the Philippine Team and swam in the 400-meter individual medley at age eleven. But it was in his first Southeast Asian Games in 1985, held in Bangkok, Thailand, where he snatched the gold in the same category at the age of fifteen. He participated in the 1988 Summer Olympics and was also chosen as the country's flag bearer for the opening ceremonies.

In the 1989 Southeast Asian Games in Kuala Lumpur, Malaysia, Buhain broke one of the existing SEA Games swimming records. In the 1991 Southeast Asian Games, where the Philippines was the host, he made a huge contribution to the gold medal record of the host country by winning most of the events in swimming. He was chosen to represent the Philippines in the 1992 Summer Olympics. He didn't win any medals in that sporting event.

Even though he won several gold medals in the 1993 Southeast Asian Games, Buhain decided to retire from his swimming career. He was disappointed by the poor government management that led to a mediocre performance of the Philippines team in that sporting event.

Sports administration
Buhain spent his early career in sport administration as the national training director of the Philippine Amateur Swimming Association (PASA) and president of the Professional Swimming Coaches Academy of the Philippines (ProSCAP).

In 2001, President Gloria Macapagal-Arroyo appointed Buhain as the chairman of the Philippine Sports Commission after learning of the Philippines poor international ranking in sports. He instituted reforms that led to protests by some commissioners and employees. In 2003, the Philippines increased its rank in the medal tally in the Southeast Asian Games and the country won several medals in the 2002 Asian Games after getting only a bronze medal in the 1998 Asian Games.

Barely six months before the 2005 Southeast Asian Games, he was appointed by President Arroyo as the chairman of the Games and Amusement Board (GAB), a public agency that handles professional sporting and gambling events.

On March 15, 2010, he left the GAB when President Arroyo appointed him as a director of the Bureau of Immigration.

Politics
In the 2022 elections, Buhain is a candidate for representative of Batangas' 1st district, the seat his wife is scheduled to vacate. He ran against his sister-in-law, Lisa Ermita, and won.

Personal life
The oldest child of former Bacoor, Cavite municipal vice mayor Cecilia Reyes-Buhain, Eric finished his elementary and secondary education at the De La Salle Santiago Zobel School in Ayala Alabang. In 1991, he earned his Bachelor of Science degree in finance at La Salle University in Philadelphia, United States.

Buhain is the husband of Representative Eileen Ermita-Buhain of the 1st district of Batangas, and the son-in-law of former Executive Secretary Eduardo Ermita.

Buhain is the older sibling of Atty. Camille Buhain-Javier, one of the three women-lawyers behind the popular Filipino YouTube channel, The Soshal Network.

Honors and awards

 Philippine Sports Hall of Fame: 2021
PSA Athlete of the Year: 1987, 1991

References

 

1970 births
Living people
Olympic swimmers of the Philippines
Filipino male swimmers
Swimmers at the 1988 Summer Olympics
Swimmers at the 1992 Summer Olympics
Swimmers at the 1990 Asian Games
Chairpersons of the Philippine Sports Commission
Arroyo administration personnel
Southeast Asian Games medalists in swimming
Southeast Asian Games gold medalists for the Philippines
Southeast Asian Games competitors for the Philippines
Southeast Asian Games silver medalists for the Philippines
Southeast Asian Games bronze medalists for the Philippines
Competitors at the 1985 Southeast Asian Games
Competitors at the 1987 Southeast Asian Games
Competitors at the 1989 Southeast Asian Games
Competitors at the 1991 Southeast Asian Games
Competitors at the 1993 Southeast Asian Games
Asian Games competitors for the Philippines
Philippine Sports Hall of Fame inductees